Now Gurab (also Romanized as Now Gūrāb and Nau Gurāb; also known as Nukurab) is a village in Gasht Rural District, in the Central District of Fuman County, Gilan Province, Iran. At the 2006 census, its population was 449, in 119 families.

References 

Populated places in Fuman County